John T. Clark (real name John Terence Kelly) is a fictional character created by Tom Clancy. He has been featured in many of his Ryanverse novels. Although he first appeared in The Cardinal of the Kremlin (1988), his origin story was detailed in Without Remorse (1993).

Clark has been described by his creator as "Ryan’s dark side" and "more inclined to take physical action than Jack is." A former Navy SEAL, he became an operations officer for the Central Intelligence Agency, and at one point served as Ryan's driver and bodyguard. During Ryan's first term as President of the United States, Clark served as director of a multinational counterterrorism unit codenamed Rainbow, which is composed of elite soldiers from countries which are part of the North Atlantic Treaty Organization (NATO). After retiring from CIA and Rainbow, Clark then worked for The Campus, an off-the-books intelligence organization created by President Ryan, later acquiring a position as director of operations.

In film, Clark has been portrayed by Willem Dafoe, Liev Schreiber, and Michael B. Jordan, the latter in a planned series including adaptations of Without Remorse and the in-development Rainbow Six. Clark has also appeared in the Rainbow Six series of video games.

Profile

Personal life
John Kelly was born in Indianapolis to Irish-American parents somewhere in 1944-1945 and raised as a Catholic. His father, Timothy Kelly, served in the Navy during World War II and was a fireman who perished from a heart attack during a fire. John lost his mother to cancer when he was a young boy. He attended Brebeuf Jesuit Preparatory School in Indianapolis.

His first wife Patricia "Tish" was pregnant when she was killed in a car accident. Six months after his wife died, Kelly had a brief relationship with Pamela Madden, a former prostitute who had been forced into working as a courier for a drug ring. She was later recaptured by members of the ring and subsequently tortured, raped, and killed; Kelly was gravely wounded. While recovering from his injuries at Johns Hopkins Hospital, he met his future second wife, nurse Sandra "Sandy" O'Toole. They eventually had two daughters, Patricia Doris and Margaret Pamela.

Kelly, who had by now changed his identity to Clark, first met Domingo "Ding" Chavez in the CIA during a black operation in Colombia (Clear and Present Danger). They would later work frequently together in succeeding novels. Chavez becomes Clark's son-in-law when he marries his daughter Patricia, and they later have a son, John Conor, who was born in Rainbow Six, although misnamed as John Patrick in Threat Vector.

Professional life

When Clark was 18, he joined the US Navy (as John Terence Kelly) and later became a Navy SEAL who participated in several special operations, one of which was the rescue of a naval aviator shot down over North Vietnam. The aviator was the son of Admiral Dutch Maxwell and his rescue earned Kelly a promotion to Chief Petty Officer. After his first tour of duty, Kelly left the Navy but was later re-hired by the Central Intelligence Agency's (CIA) Special Activities Division (Special Operations Group) for another mission in Vietnam; a rescue operation on a secret POW camp. At the same time, Kelly was carrying out his own war at home against a drug ring that killed his girlfriend, Pamela Madden. While he succeeded in taking it down, the Baltimore Police Department (including Emmet Ryan, Jack Ryan's father) eventually identifies him as the man who murdered the drug dealers. In response, Kelly faked his own death (with the help of the CIA, which falsifies the identity of his fingerprints in his Navy personnel file) and goes to work for the CIA full-time, under the pseudonym "John Clark". (See Without Remorse) His middle name appears variously with one and two 'R's, and the name "John Terrence Clark" appears in the novel Clear and Present Danger.

Throughout his career, Clark has been through a number of real-life crisis zones. In addition to the Vietnam War, he has also been through the Iran hostage crisis (see Debt of Honor) and the Gulf War, plus a number of missions in the Soviet Union, and claims to have "had Abu Nidal's head in my gunsights", but never got the green light allowing him to kill the man (Clear and Present Danger).

He first enters the Jack Ryan universe in Without Remorse, which also features police officer Emmet Ryan and his son Jack. Although he does not appear in Patriot Games, it is later revealed that he was the CIA's liaison with a French black ops unit involved in the campaign against the ULA. He also does not appear in Red Rabbit, but is mentioned as giving advice to trainees at The Farm, the CIA training facility. He appears briefly in The Cardinal of the Kremlin, during which he extracts KGB Chairman Gerasimov's wife and daughter from Leningrad after the Chairman decides to defect to the United States. This marks Clark's first published appearance.

In Clear and Present Danger, he commands a U.S. Army black-ops unit carrying out a secret war against the Medellín Cartel in Colombia. When the government abandons the men for political reasons, Clark and Jack Ryan fly down to Colombia and rescue the survivors. This is the first time he interacts with Ryan.

In The Sum of All Fears, he is Ryan's personal driver and bodyguard. Later in the novel, he is returned to the field for one operation, bugging the aircraft of the Japanese Prime Minister in Mexico City. During the operation, a terrorist bombing in Denver occurs and his mission is changed to intercepting the Palestinian terrorists trying to escape through Mexico, which he does successfully. He interrogates them and secures their confessions, then hands them over to the judicial system for eventual Islamic justice (execution by sword) in Riyadh.

In Debt of Honor, he is again a field officer for the CIA's Directorate of Operations (DO). At the beginning of the novel, he and Domingo Chavez capture an Aidid-like African warlord, Mohammed Abdul Corp, and bring him to justice. Soon thereafter, they are sent to Japan to assess the national mood of the country, where Clark is undercover as a Russian reporter. When the situation turns into a war between Japan and the United States, they establish contacts with the opposition in the Japanese government and are also tasked to eliminate a pair of Japanese AWACS planes.

Clark spends the first half of the next book, Executive Orders, serving as an instructor for CIA field officers in training. Early in the novel, Jack Ryan, the new President, issues a presidential pardon to John Terence Kelly for his several murders. This clears his name and personal honor, but he will continue his career as John Clark. Towards the end of the book, he and Chavez are returned to the field and ordered to discover who is responsible for an Ebola attack on the United States, an action they quickly trace to the new United Islamic Republic (comprising Iran and Iraq). With the cooperation of the Russian SVR, they are infiltrated into Tehran, where they laser-designate the home of UIR dictator Mahmoud Haji Daryaei so that Air Force stealth aircraft can destroy the house.

The next year, Clark writes a memo to the CIA expressing his concerns over the rise of international terrorism since the demise of the Cold War, and recommends creating a NATO response team that could be rapidly deployed in terrorist situations. This special unit is created soon thereafter, with its base in Hereford, England. It is code-named Rainbow, and Clark is put in command of the unit with the equivalent rank of major general.

In the book Rainbow Six, Rainbow is first put into operation. It responds successfully to three attacks by "Red" terrorists in Bern, Vienna, and Madrid. It also succeeds in defending itself from an attack by the Provisional Irish Republican Army (PIRA) against its home base. This is eventually determined to have been ordered by a radical eco-terrorist group, which Rainbow tracks down and destroys in the last pages of the novel.

Clark's next appearance is in The Bear and the Dragon, where he is still the head of Rainbow. Initially assigned to train Russian Spetsnaz operatives, Rainbow is temporarily deployed to the Russian-Chinese war being fought in Siberia. In a joint Rainbow-Spetsnaz operation, he is involved in the destruction of China's only ICBM base. The operation is mostly successful: all but one of the missiles is destroyed, and the last one, while it is fired, is destroyed by the Navy before it can reach its intended target.

Neither Clark nor Rainbow appears in The Teeth of the Tiger, but it is revealed that Rainbow is still operating. Prior to Jack Ryan resigning as President, Clark's Navy Cross was upgraded to the Medal of Honor. During the Medal of Honor ceremony Jack Ryan, Jr. was present in the Oval Office.

Clark returns in Dead or Alive, in which he is part of a Rainbow team that successfully rescues all hostages taken by terrorists at the Swedish embassy in Libya. This proves to be his last act with the CIA, as he is pushed into retirement by Kealty political appointees. He then joins The Campus, an off-the-books intelligence agency that Ryan had founded before the end of his presidency. Clark is immediately involved with the organization's effort to find and neutralize "the Emir", an international terrorist leader modeled on Osama bin Laden, while also serving as mentor and trainer to Jack's son Jack Jr., a Campus analyst who wants to do fieldwork.

In Locked On, Clark becomes a pawn in Czech billionaire and Kealty supporter Paul Laska's vendetta to discredit Ryan during the presidential campaign. The Emir had identified him as one of his captors to his Laska-affiliated lawyer. When it was revealed that he killed an East German Stasi operative in Berlin in 1981 (which was not a CIA matter but a personal job by his friend and Berlin station chief who had been blackmailed), he becomes the subject of a manhunt by the FBI and later French investigators hired by Laska.

Clark goes on the run and travels to eastern Europe to clear his name, later finding out that rogue SVR operative Valentin Kovalenko had given the information to Laska, who in turn covertly presented it to Kealty. However, he is captured shortly after and later tortured for information about The Campus by Kovalenko's men. He is later rescued by the Russian government, who then assigns him to temporarily lead Rainbow in order to retake a Russian spaceport which had been hijacked by Muslim Dagestani terrorists intent on launching nuclear weapons into Moscow.

In Threat Vector, Clark has been exonerated by the outgoing Kealty administration. After an assassination job on a cell of former Libyan intelligence officers in Istanbul, he briefly retires from The Campus due to old age. However, he later comes out of retirement when Chinese special operations forces attack the headquarters of The Campus. He travels to China with fellow Campus operatives and works with the local rebels and FSB to assassinate People's Liberation Army Chairman Su Ke Qiang, who has been waging war against the United States by trying to annex Hong Kong, Macau, Taiwan, and territories in the South China Sea by military force as well as sanctioning cyberattacks on the U.S.

In Command Authority, Clark becomes director of operations for The Campus. He travels to Ukraine along with his fellow operatives to gather intelligence on Russian criminal organization Seven Strong Men and its leader Gleb the Scar. They take part in defending a CIA special mission compound in Sevastopol, which came under attack from pro-Russian protesters aided by FSB proxy agents and the Seven Strong Men. Clark later cooperates with Delta Force operatives in capturing Gleb the Scar, revealed to be directly involved in the polonium poisoning of former SVR head Sergey Golovko, in his heavily-guarded base of operations in Kyiv.

In Full Force and Effect, Clark and his fellow Campus colleagues investigate a connection between an American corporate espionage firm and the North Korean government, who are intent on producing nuclear weapons. In Commander in Chief, he tracks down the accountant of Russian president Valeri Volodin, who has been moving his personal net worth to a safe place in anticipation of his failure to placate the siloviki should his plan of a covert armed offensive across Europe fail to repair the ongoing economic recession in his country. In True Faith and Allegiance, Clark helps investigate a series of terrorist attacks on American military and intelligence personnel, which is due to a massive intelligence breach. He later assassinates a Saudi technocrat who has been setting up ISIS with the attacks in order to save his country from economic ruin in a quagmire likely to result from American troops being redeployed to the Middle East.

In Power and Empire, Clark investigates Chinese agent provocateur Vincent Chen's connection to a sex trafficking ring in Texas. He wages a one-man war on the ring in order to save a prostitute as well, who had been instrumental in revealing China's involvement in several false flag attacks designed to blame the current president, whose moderate stance on several issues compelled a secret cabal to act to have him removed from power. Clark was later arrested for murder, but was released from police custody soon after.

Clark briefly appears in Line of Sight, where he assassinates a Romanian crime boss who had a vendetta against Jack Ryan Jr. in revenge for killing one of his associates in a previous novel.

In Oath of Office, Clark leads a surveillance operation in Portugal on French arms dealer Hugo Gaspard, who has ties to ISIS. He witnesses Gaspard's murder by French assassin Lucile Fournier, who works under rival arms dealer Urbano da Rocha. Clark and his team then proceed to shadow Da Rocha and Fournier, who later strike a deal intended for Gaspard with a pair of Russian GRU officers. However, the Russians later double cross da Rocha, attempting to kill him in his villa. Clark rescues the arms dealer, who later reveals a plot to provide stolen nuclear weapons to dissident Reza Kazem on behalf of the GRU and the Iranian government.

In Code of Honor, Clark leads the Campus's efforts to retrieve Calliope, a next-generation AI software, before the Chinese military uses it for sinister purposes. He later tracks down Kang, an assassin working for the People's Liberation Army who had tried to assassinate a former Navy admiral who now works for a communications company.

Outside the novels, John Clark's career continues further in the Rainbow Six video game series. In Rainbow Six: Critical Hour, Clark retires and passes the leadership of Team Rainbow on to Chavez. Although Chavez appears in Rainbow Six: Vegas as Rainbow commander, no mention is made of Clark.

Awards
John Clark has been awarded the Navy Cross, Silver Star with an oak leaf cluster, Bronze Star with Valor devices with three oak leaf clusters, three Purple Hearts and four Intelligence Stars. He is also a recipient of the Medal of Honor, awarded and presented to him by Jack Ryan (then President of the U.S.) for the rescue of a downed fighter pilot during his time in Vietnam (see Without Remorse). He is a simulated major general in the Rainbow Six book, though he only reached the rank of Chief Boatswain's Mate (Chief Petty Officer) during his Naval career.

Distinguishing marks
Clark has a small tattoo of a red seal, sitting up on its hind flippers "grinning impudently" on his forearm. Though no other visual details are given, a comment made by Lieutenant Colonel Daniel "Bear" Malloy in Rainbow Six indicated that at least some soldiers in Ryanverse who dealt with special operations had heard of the red seal tattoo and understood that it was associated with the Third Special Operations Group (SOG), with whom Clark served during the Vietnam War. Clark stated that everyone in his unit got the tattoo. In the real world, having such a tattoo would violate operations security (OPSEC); however, similar tattoos are not particularly uncommon, so long as the tattoo is not specifically unit identifiable. Also, the Third SOG is not a real military unit, but a similarly named group, the Studies and Observation Group MACV-SOG, was initially named the Special Operations Group and was active in Vietnam in the types of operations and environments referenced in the series, and had Navy SEALs among its personnel. The symbol of the red seal is actually the unit insignia for SEAL Team 1.

Literary appearances
The character John Clark appears in the following books:

The Cardinal of the Kremlin (1988)
Clear and Present Danger (1989)
The Sum of All Fears (1991)
Without Remorse (1993)
Debt of Honor (1994)
Executive Orders (1996)
Rainbow Six (1998)
The Bear and the Dragon (2000)
Red Rabbit (2002) (mentioned only)
Dead or Alive (2010)
Locked On (2011)
Threat Vector (2012)
Command Authority (2013)
Full Force and Effect (2014)
Under Fire (2015)
Commander in Chief (2015)
True Faith and Allegiance (2016)
Power and Empire (2017)
Oath of Office (2018)
Code of Honor (2019)
Firing Point (2020)

In other media

Film
In 2012 Paramount Pictures began developing a film adaptation of Without Remorse, and reportedly were in early negotiations with Tom Hardy to play Clark. By September 2018, Michael B. Jordan was cast to play John Clark in the new film series. Without Remorse was released on 30 April 2021 and was directed by Stefano Sollima from a screenplay written by Taylor Sheridan and Will Staples. It is produced by Akiva Goldsman.  Rainbow Six is currently in development.

Jack Ryan films 
John Clark has been portrayed by Willem Dafoe in Clear and Present Danger (1994) and Liev Schreiber in The Sum of All Fears (2002).

In Clear and Present Danger Clark is initially depicted as a cynical and opportunistic mercenary, but slowly reveals his virtues. Clark aids Ryan in rescuing Clark’s men from Escobedo and Cortez, saving Ryan’s life.

In The Sum of All Fears Clark is depicted as a much more sardonic character, though he, like his novel counterpart, has also participated in numerous CIA operations.

References

See also
 Tom Clancy's Rainbow Six
 Tom Clancy's Rainbow Six (video game)

Fictional Central Intelligence Agency personnel
Fictional characters from Indiana
Fictional commanders
Fictional vigilantes
Fictional United States Navy SEALs personnel
Fictional Medal of Honor recipients
Fictional secret agents and spies
Fictional Vietnam War veterans
Fictional military personnel in films
Tom Clancy characters
Ryanverse characters
Tom Clancy's Rainbow Six
Literary characters introduced in 1987
Characters in American novels of the 20th century
Action film characters